Mythili Kumar is a dancer, teacher, and choreographer. She performs the Bharatanatyam, Kuchipudi, and Odissi styles of Indian classical dance. Founder of Abhinaya Dance Company of San Jose and she is a lecturer in dance at University of California, Santa Cruz.

Biography 
As founder and Director of Abhinaya Dance Company of San Jose since 1980, she has trained and presented over one hundred dancers in their solo debuts and has collaborated extensively with several multi-cultural organizations. She has also taught classes at San Jose State University and Stanford University.

Kumar's two daughter's, Rasika and Malavika are active in the dance company and have been trained in classical Indian dance since age 4.

Collaborative performances include:

 The Guru with Kathak maestro Chitresh Das and his dance company,
 In the Spirit (1993) with Japanese drumming corps San Jose Taiko, with Margaret Wingrove and her modern dance company;
 The Ramayana (1997) with the Balinese music and dance ensemble Gamelan Sekar Jaya and
 Vande Mataram - Mother, I bow to thee (1997) featuring three different Indian classical dance styles;
 The Power of Saturn (1999) with Shadow Master Larry Reed and Shadow Light Productions
 Gandhi - the Mahatma (1995) for the Asian Art Museum in San Francisco.

Awards 
In 2010 she was awarded the Malonga Casquelourd Lifetime Achievement Award by San Francisco Ethnic Dance Festival. Kumar received the choreographer's fellowships from 1989 until 1993  and a teacher's recognition certificate in 1998 from the National Endowment for the Arts.

See also
Indian women in dance
List of people from San Jose, California

References

Notes 
.
.
.
.
.
.
.

American women artists of Indian descent
Artists from San Jose, California
American female dancers
Living people
Kuchipudi exponents
Indian female classical dancers
Performers of Indian classical dance
20th-century American dancers
20th-century Indian dancers
Year of birth missing (living people)
20th-century American women
20th-century Indian women
21st-century American women